The 2022–23 Liga 1 (also known as the 2022–23 BRI Liga 1 for sponsorship reasons) is the 13th season of the Liga 1, the top Indonesian professional league for association football clubs since its establishment in 2008. It started on 23 July 2022. Bali United are the two-time defending champions.

Summary 
Following the Kanjuruhan Stadium disaster, in which at least 133 people were killed in a stampede provoked by police use of tear gas among fans who were still in the stadium, competition in all top three leagues in Indonesia were placed on hold. On 8 October 2022, FIFA recommended that matches be played no later than 17:00 (WIB) and only on weekends to avoid risky situations in some matches.

On 3 December 2022, PSSI announced that the league would resume on 5 December, with all remaining matches being held behind closed doors at least until the first half of the season ended.

Teams
Eighteen teams is competing in the league – the top fifteen teams from the previous season and the three teams promoted from the Liga 2. The promoted teams are Persis (returned to the top flight after fourteen years), RANS Nusantara and Dewa United (both teams will play in the Liga 1 for the first time in their history). They replaced Persipura, Persela (both teams were relegated for the first time since 2008) and Persiraja (relegated after just two seasons back in the top flight).

Name changes
On 30 May 2022, during the 2022 PSSI Ordinary Congress, four teams had their name change requests accepted by the federation:
 Dewa United removed "Martapura" from its official name, having previously acquired Martapura to play in Liga 2 last season.
 Borneo added their home city of "Samarinda" to their full name, thus becoming Borneo Samarinda.
 TIRA-Persikabo officially changed its name to Persikabo 1973, even though the name was already used for the last season as a commercial arrangement.
 RANS Cilegon changed its name to RANS Nusantara and moved their homebase to Jakarta. Therefore, the club will play their home matches at the Pakansari Stadium, which is also the home of Persikabo.

Stadiums and locations

Personnel and kits

Notes:
 On the front of shirt.
 On the back of shirt.
 On the sleeves.
 On the shorts.
 Apparel made by club.

Coaching changes

Foreign players
PSSI restricts the number of foreign players to four per team with one of them must come from an association member from the Asian Football Confederation. Teams can use all the foreign players at once.
 Players named in bold indicates the player was registered during the mid-season transfer window.
 Former players named in italics are players that were out of squad or left the club within the season, after the pre-season transfer window, or in the mid-season transfer window, and at least had one appearance.

League table

Results

Additional play-offs for qualifications
Due to the change of AFC competition dates to an autumn–spring format, two seasons of Indonesian domestic football will have been completed before the next AFC competitions begin, therefore requiring additional play-offs to be held between the qualifying teams from each season.

Qualification for 2023–24 AFC Champions League play-off stage

Season statistics

Top goalscorers

Discipline 

 Most yellow card(s): 12
  Jihad Ayoub (PSS)
 Most red card(s): 2
  Jaimerson (Persis)

Hat-tricks

Awards

Monthly awards

Attendances

See also 
 2022–23 Liga 2
 2022–23 Liga 3
 2022–23 Piala Indonesia

References

External links
 

Liga 1 seasons
Liga 1
Liga 1
Indonesia
Liga 1
Liga 1
Indonesia